Rhopobota falcata is a species of moth of the family Tortricidae. It is found in China (Guangxi) and Japan.

The wingspan is 12-15.5 mm.

References

Moths described in 1999
Eucosmini